John George Sheppard  (30 January 1824 – 28 May 1882) was an English first-class cricketer.

The son of John Wilson Sheppard, he was born in January 1824 at Ashe High House near Woodbridge, Suffolk. He was educated at Harrow School, before going up to Trinity College, Cambridge. Though he did not play first-class cricket for Cambridge University, Sheppard made two first-class appearances for the Marylebone Cricket Club (MCC) in 1845, against Cambridge University at Parker's Piece and Oxford University at Oxford. The following year he played a first-class match for the North against the MCC at Lord's. He married Harriet Anna Tyrwhitt Jones, the daughter of Sir Thomas Tyrwhitt Jones, in August 1846. Sheppard later served as the deputy lieutenant of Suffolk in 1856 and the High Sheriff of Suffolk in 1859. He also served as a justice of the peace for Suffolk. Sheppard died at London in May 1882.

References

External links

1824 births
1882 deaths
People from Woodbridge, Suffolk
People educated at Harrow School
Alumni of Trinity College, Cambridge
English cricketers
Marylebone Cricket Club cricketers
North v South cricketers
English justices of the peace
Deputy Lieutenants of Suffolk
High Sheriffs of Suffolk